U.S. Life Saving Station Station No. 14 is located in Seaside Park, Ocean County, New Jersey, United States. The station was built in 1894 and added to the National Register of Historic Places on January 30, 1978.

See also
United States Life-Saving Service
National Register of Historic Places listings in Ocean County, New Jersey

References

Shingle Style architecture in New Jersey
Government buildings completed in 1894
Buildings and structures in Ocean County, New Jersey
Government buildings on the National Register of Historic Places in New Jersey
Life-Saving Service stations
National Register of Historic Places in Ocean County, New Jersey
New Jersey Register of Historic Places
Life-Saving Service stations on the National Register of Historic Places
Seaside Park, New Jersey